Yoon Hye-Suk (born ) is a retired South Korean female volleyball player. She was part of the South Korea women's national volleyball team.

She participated at the 2009 FIVB Women's World Grand Champions Cup, and at the 2010 FIVB Volleyball Women's World Championship. She played with Hyundai.

Clubs
 Hyundai (2010)

References

1983 births
Living people
South Korean women's volleyball players
Place of birth missing (living people)
Beach volleyball players at the 2014 Asian Games
Asian Games competitors for South Korea